Genius is a newspaper cartoon series by Scottish (specifically Glaswegian) artist John Glashan that appeared in The Observer newspaper in the United Kingdom from 1978 to 1983.

The chief characters were Anode Enzyme and Lord Doberman.  Their adventures were mostly surreal and the humour relied heavily upon Glashan's imaginative watercolour artwork.

Anode Enzyme
Anode Enzyme was the chief protagonist (along with Lord Doberman) of "Genius".
With an IQ of 12790 (was 12794-but lost four points watching TV) and only requiring seven minutes of sleep a day, Anode Enzyme is characterised by his genius.  He meets Lord Doberman, the world's richest man, and devises ways of getting rid of his wealth by inventing a machine that fires 40 TV sets into the sea every minute and a device that can stack £300,000,000 into a continuous pile. 
Other inventions include a paint that incorporates its own paint stripper, a "Doom Module" that runs in terror from anything that moves, and a game that involves striking a solid melamine sphere, coach bolted to a billiard table with a 3lb vanadium steel, leather faced hammer - one point for each hit.

External links
John Glashan

British comic strips
Adventure comics
1978 comics debuts
1983 comics endings
Comics characters introduced in 1978
Fantasy comics
British comics characters